Palisades Tahoe is a ski resort in the western United States, located in Olympic Valley, California, northwest of Tahoe City in the Sierra Nevada range. From its founding in 1949, the resort was known as Squaw Valley, but it changed its name in 2021 due to the derogatory connotations of the word "squaw". It was the host site for the 1960 Winter Olympics.

The Palisades Tahoe resort is the largest skiing complex in the Lake Tahoe region, and is known for its challenging terrain. The resort attracts approximately 600,000 skiers a year, and is also home to several annual summer events.

The spotlight of the 1960 Olympics raised the resort's profile, and it went through several ownership changes beginning in the 1970s. However, a proposed gondola connection between the resorts, as well as a proposed development at its base, has met with controversy from environmentalists.

History

Construction
Former University of Nevada star skier, Wayne Poulsen, purchased the first  of Squaw Valley Ski Resort from the Southern Pacific Railroad. Poulsen already had a history in the area: in 1931, he had placed third at an Olympic trials at Granlibakken in Tahoe City. Shortly after, Poulsen met Harvard alumnus and trained lawyer Alex Cushing, who brought capital, political connections, and increased access to the project. Cushing had fallen in love with Lake Tahoe after a visit to the Sierra Nevada in 1946. After a disagreement over the resort's future, Cushing gained control of the project and became the chairman of Squaw Valley Ski Corporation.  The resort opened in 1949, and Cushing remained its chairman until his death.

Cushing modeled the resort after European ski destinations by locating a swimming pool, ice rink, roller disco, and restaurants on the mountain instead of at the base. His designs also brought advanced lift technology to the U.S. for the first time. When Palisades Tahoe opened, its Squaw One lift was deemed the longest double chairlift in the world.

1960 Winter Olympics

Palisades Tahoe's success can be largely attributed to the visibility that came from hosting the 1960 Winter Olympics, a direct result of Cushing's effort and determination. During the planning stages of the 1960 Olympics, Innsbruck, Austria, was the leading choice for the Olympic site. In 1955, however, Cushing secured the bid after winning over the International Olympic Committee in Paris with a scale model of his planned Olympic site. The Winter Olympics in 1960 were the first to be televised live, making the games accessible to millions of viewers in real-time.  The event signaled the rise of United States skiing to the level of world-famous European skiing, and Squaw Valley's preparedness for the games showed the international community that United States ski resorts offered world-class facilities.

During the Olympics, Palisades Tahoe was designated as California Historical Landmark Number 724. A marker was placed identifying Palisades Tahoe as a Pioneer Ski Area of America. The marker's plaque commemorated 100 years of organized skiing in "mining towns in the Sierra Nevada, particularly Whiskey Diggs, Poker Flat, Port Wine, Onion Valley, La Porte, and Johnsville".

Palisades Tahoe hosted World Cup races in 1969 with four technical events: slalom and giant slalom for both men and women. American Billy Kidd won the men's slalom, followed by U.S. teammates Rick Chaffee (4th) and Spider Sabich (10th) of Kyburz. After an absence of 48 years, women's technical races returned in March 2017 and overall leader Mikaela Shiffrin of Colorado won both events.

Ownership changes  

In 1971, following several years of financial losses, the state announced it would seek bids to buy Squaw Valley. After a bid by John Fell Stevenson failed, Dick Baker and his Australian company Mainline Corporation successfully bid $25 million plus 1,500 acres from the Poulsens. In August 1974 the Australian company Mainline Corporation collapsed and Squaw Valley was again back on the market for sale.

In 1978, Squaw Valley experienced one of the worst cable car accidents in history.  On a stormy afternoon late in the season on Saturday, 15 April, the tram came off of one of its cables, dropped  and then bounced back up, colliding with a cable which sheared through the car; four were killed and 31 injured.

Squaw Valley was purchased by private equity group KSL Capital Partners in November 2010. In September 2011, Alpine Meadows Ski Resort and Squaw Valley Ski Resort announced their intention to merge ownership. The merger united the two popular ski destinations under common management by Squaw's Valley's parent company, KSL Capital Partners, LLC.  A year later, Squaw Valley and Alpine Meadows Ski Resort merged under the new umbrella leadership of Squaw Valley Ski Holdings, LLC. The new company started to operate as one, under the combined name Squaw Valley Alpine Meadows, with joint lift tickets and single season passes for visitors and free shuttles between its locations, but preserves the individuality of the two resorts. In 2017, KSL Capital, in partnership with Aspen/Snowmass (Henry Crown and Company), formed Alterra Mountain Company, which then became the primary owner of Squaw Valley.

Alpine Meadows gondola connection  

Squaw Valley Ski Holdings, LLC sought to connect to the Alpine Meadows resort with a "Base-to-Base" gondola. Resort owners needed permission from local land managers, including Placer County and the Tahoe National Forest who had to study the proposed project's environmental impacts. 

A number of conservation organizations, including Sierra Watch and the Sierra Club, considered the proposed gondola a threat to Granite Chief Wilderness. In July 2019 Sierra Watch and Granite Chief Wilderness Protection League filed a lawsuit against Squaw Valley challenging Placer County's approval of the gondola project. In January 2020 the United States Forest Service issued its Record of Decision approving a route crossing federal lands. In February 2020, the litigants dropped the suit in exchange for Squaw Valley's commitment to implement measures to mitigate the impact towards the Sierra Nevada yellow-legged frog. 

The approved gondola was planned to cross the private ski area White Wolf Mountain, which is owned by Troy Caldwell, who supported the gondola's construction. Construction of the gondola commenced in Summer 2021, and in 2022 the base-to-base gondola finally opened, connecting the Palisades Tahoe resort with Alpine Meadows, while crossing through neighboring resort White Wolf Mountain.

Development controversy

Separate from the approved Squaw Alpine proposed gondola, Squaw Alpine has also proposed a large development in the existing Squaw Valley parking lot area. In 2016, Squaw Valley Ski Holdings submitted a final application for entitlements for its proposed Village at Squaw Valley Specific Plan, a $1-billion plan that prompted the Attorney General of California to write a letter of concern to Placer County. The plan would include 850 hotel and condominium units and a 96-foot-tall "Mountain Adventure Camp" featuring a year-round indoor waterpark. According to the environmental review for the project, new development is projected to add 3,300 new car trips to local roads on peak days, and the project would have twenty "significant but unavoidable" impacts".

Sierra Watch created a grassroots campaign to "Keep Squaw True", holding public events and circulating an online petition in opposition to KSL Capital Partners' proposed expansion plan.

In November 2016, the Placer County Board of Supervisors approved KSL's controversial development proposal in spite of opposition from local conservation organizations, including Sierra Watch. Sierra Watch filed suit to overturn those approvals for violating the California Environmental Quality Act in December 2016.

In 2017, resort owners added a roller coaster to their development proposal.

Squaw Valley name controversy 
The term "squaw" is considered offensive by many Native Americans, and the Washoe tribe, which is native to the region, has criticized its use in the name of the resort. As a result, the resort announced on August 25, 2020, that the name would be changed. President Ron Cohen said in a statement, "While we love our local history and the memories we all associate with this place as it has been named for so long, we are confronted with the overwhelming evidence that the term 'squaw' is considered offensive." The new name, Palisades Tahoe, was formally announced on September 13, 2021. Later that day, the Washoe tribe sent out a press release stating that the tribe "commends and fully supports the resort management and others who contributed to this milestone decision." After coming to an agreement regarding the name change, the ski resort and the Washoe tribe have been working together in educating resort guests about tribal culture, with the resort launching a Washoe cultural tour and an exhibit on the Washoe way of life.

Chairlifts

Lower mountain chairs (elev. 6,200 ft) - Palisades

Upper mountain chairs (elev. 8,200 ft) - Palisades

Front Side Chairs (elev. 6,835 ft) - Alpine Meadows

Back Side Chairs (elev. 7,087 ft) - Alpine Meadows

Terrain aspect
 North: 50%
 East: 40%
 West: 2%
 South: 8%

Snowfall

Annual snowfall at Palisades Tahoe can surpass .

References

External links

 

Alterra Mountain Company
Venues of the 1960 Winter Olympics
Olympic Parks
Companies based in Placer County, California
Olympic alpine skiing venues
Ski areas and resorts in California
Sports venues in Placer County, California
Tourist attractions in Placer County, California
Sports in Olympic Valley, California